

Samogitia National Park or Žemaitija National Park is a national park in Lithuania. It is situated on the Samogitian Highlands, 45 km from the Baltic Sea. Lakes cover more than 7% of its territory. Lake Plateliai (12.05 km2, 47 m depth) is the largest lake. The town of Plateliai, situated on the shore of the lake, is the seat of the park's administration and a popular tourist destination. The Park has Category II in the classification of the IUCN.

Nature 
The hilly relief of the Samogitian Park was formed by the melting glacier about 12,000 years ago. The resulting hills are relatively high, about 150–190 meters. Lakes occupies more than 7%. park territories, the largest Samogitia Plateliai Lake is concentrated here, in addition to which there are 25 smaller lakes.

Forests occupy about 45 percent of the park. all areas. The forested wetlands of Plokštinė and Rukundžiai, the hydrographic complexes of Plateliai Lake, Laumalenka and Šilinė, the valleys of the Gardai esker, Babrungas and Mergupis rivers, Paburgė, Siberia, Pakastuva, Užpelkiai, Ertenis and Paparčiai wetlands are especially valuable for science. and Pailgis forests and Juodupis wetlands ecosystems, rare plants and animals. Rare Atlantic salmon and freshwater whitefish Coregonus albula and Coregonus lavaretus breed in Plateliai Lake.

Grows to 7.2 m in volume, 2.1 m in diameter and 34 m in height . Wolves and lynxes found home here. Nine species of bats fly at night.

See also
 List of national parks in the Baltics

References 

National parks of Lithuania
Protected areas established in 1991
1991 establishments in Lithuania
Tourist attractions in Telšiai County
Samogitia